1984 Paralympics may refer to:
1984 Summer Paralympics
1984 Winter Paralympics